Artūrs Toms Plešs (born 4 January 1992) is a Latvian politician.  he serves as Minister for Environmental Protection and Regional Development in the cabinet of Prime Minister Arturs Krišjānis Kariņš.

References 

Living people
1992 births
Place of birth missing (living people)
21st-century Latvian politicians
Ministers of the Environment of Latvia